The Dark Cinema is a 2019 Burmese horror film starring Nay Toe, Kyaw Kyaw Bo, Min Thway, Riya Ray and Nan Su Oo. The film, produced by 7th Sense Film Production premiered in Myanmar on April 25, 2019.

Cast
 Nay Toe as Nyan Lin Aung
 Kyaw Kyaw Bo as Ye Thiha
 Min Thway as Kyaw Swar
 Riya Ray as Riya
 Nan Su Oo as Yati

References

External links

2019 films
2010s Burmese-language films
Burmese horror films
Films shot in Myanmar